The 2015 Kawasaki Frontale season saw the club compete in the J1 League, the top league of Japanese football, in which they finished 6th.

J1 League

League table

Match details

References

External links
 J.League official site

Kawasaki Frontale
Kawasaki Frontale seasons